Ro-108 was an Imperial Japanese Navy Ro-100-class submarine. Completed and commissioned in April 1943, she served in World War II, operating in the Solomon Islands campaign, the New Guinea campaign — during which she sank the United States Navy destroyer  — and off the Admiralty Islands. She was sunk in May 1944 during her fifth war patrol.

Design and description
The Ro-100 class was a medium-sized, coastal submarine derived from the preceding Kaichū type. They displaced  surfaced and  submerged.

For surface running, the boats were powered by two  diesel engines, each driving one propeller shaft. When submerged each propeller was driven by a  electric motor. They could reach  on the surface and  underwater.

The boats were armed with four internal bow  torpedo tubes and carried a total of eight torpedoes. They were also armed with two single mounts for  Type 96 anti-aircraft guns or a single  L/40 AA gun.

Construction and commissioning

Ro-108 was laid down as Submarine No. 218 on 20 April 1942 by Kawasaki at Kobe, Japan. Renamed Ro-108 on 25 September 1942, she was launched on 26 October 1942. She was completed and commissioned on 20 April 1943.

Service history
Upon commissioning, Ro-108 was attached to the Sasebo Naval District and was assigned to the Kure Submarine Squadron for workups. On 1 August 1943, she was reassigned to Submarine Squadron 7 in the 8th Fleet in the Southeast Area Fleet. She departed Yokosuka, Japan, on 11 August 1943 bound for Rabaul on New Britain, which she reached on 16 August 1943.

First war patrol

Ro-108 got underway from Rabaul on 23 August 1943 for her first war patrol, assigned a patrol area southeast of San Cristobal in the Solomon Islands. While at sea, she was reassigned to Submarine Division 51 on 1 September 1943, but otherwise her patrol was uneventful, and she returned to Rabaul on 16 September 1943.

New Guinea campaign

Second war patrol

Ro-108 put to sea to begin her second war patrol on 23 September 1943, bound for a patrol area off Finschhafen, New Guinea. On 30 September 1943, she sighted an Allied convoy, but was unable to reach a position from which to attack it.

She avoided detection and achieved an attack position, and at about 18:12 she fired four torpedoes at the destroyers, which presented overlapping targets. Smith sighted the wakes of three of the torpedoes and made a sharp turn to "comb" them; one of them passed her  to port and another  to starboard. Henley avoided two torpedoes, but a third torpedo struck her on her port side in her No. 1 fire room, destroying her boilers and breaking her keel. Fifty-two of her survivors were injured.

Although Reid and Smith counterattacked over the next seven hours, Ro-108 escaped. She returned to Rabaul on 11 October 1943 and erroneously received credit for sinking two destroyers.

October–December 1943

While Ro-108 was anchored at Rabaul, the United States Army Air Forces Fifth Air Force and the Royal Australian Air Force combined on 12 October 1943 to stage the largest Allied air raid of the Pacific War up to that time, with 349 aircraft based in New Guinea and Australia hitting Japanese airfields around Rabaul and shipping in Simpson Harbour at Rabaul. Ro-108 avoided damage during the raid.

On 23 October 1943, Ro-108 departed Rabaul to carry supplies to Sarmi on the northern coast of New Guinea in support of Japanese forces fighting in the New Guinea campaign. She reached Sarmi on 24 October 1943, unloaded her cargo, and got back underway the same night. While heading back to Rabaul, she received orders on 26 October 1943 to patrol off Lae, New Guinea. She returned to Rabaul on 9 November 1943.

Ro-108 got underway from Rabaul on 20 November 1943 for a second supply run to Sarmi. After delivering her cargo at Sarmi on 21 November 1943, she patrolled off New Britain in the Arawe-Cape Merkus area before returning to Rabaul on 9 December 1943.

On 14 December 1943, Ro-108 put to sea from Rabaul for another supply voyage to Sarmi. Before reaching Sarmi, she was on the surface recharging her batteries in the Bismarck Sea northeast of Long Island at around 01:14 on 17 December 1943 when a PBY-5A Catalina flying boat of U.S. Navy Patrol Squadron 52 (VP-52) attacked her. The plane's crew reported seeing Ro-108 sinking by the stern and claimed to have sunk her — some historians have credited the plane with sinking the submarine , although I-179 had sunk in a diving accident off Japan in July 1943 — but Ro-108 survived the attack, albeit with serious damage that forced her to abandon her supply mission. After calling at Rabaul, she got back underway on 20 December 1943 bound for Japan, where she arrived at Sasebo on 1 January 1944 to undergo repairs.

Third and fourth war patrols

After the completion of her repairs, Ro-108 departed Sasebo on 7 March 1944 bound for Truk, which she reached on 16 March 1944. She departed Truk on 18 March 1944 to begin her third war patrol, assigned a patrol area north of the Admiralty Islands, and while at sea on 20 March 1944 was assigned to Patrol Unit A. After an otherwise quiet patrol, she returned to Truk on 29 March 1944. She again got underway from Truk on 12 April 1944, setting out on her fourth war patrol, this time south of the Admiralties. Her patrol again was uneventful, and she concluded it with her arrival at Truk on 3 May 1944.

Fifth war patrol

The picket line was tasked with providing warning of any move toward the Palau Islands by Allied invasion forces.

On 18 May 1944, U.S. Navy signals intelligence personnel intercepted and decrypted Japanese signals indicating the formation of Scouting Line NA between Truk and the Admiralties. After England sank I-16 on 19 May 1944, the hunter-killer group turned its attention to Scouting Line NA and had successes against the line when England sank Ro-106 on 22 May 1944 Ro-104 on 23 May 1944, and Ro-116 on 24 May 2022.

Loss

Shortly thereafter, England also detected Ro-108 on radar, and the two destroyer escorts closed the range. At 23:23, England attacked with a 24-projectile Hedgehog barrage. Four to six explosions followed 11 seconds later, indicating hits on Ro-108, and subsequently England′s crew witnessed a number of underwater explosions and heard rumbling noises, marking the sinking of Ro-108 with all hands.

On 25 June 1944, the Imperial Japanese Navy declared Ro-108 to be presumed lost with all 53 men on board. The Japanese struck her from the Navy list on 10 August 1944.

Notes

References
 

1942 ships
Ships built by Kawasaki Heavy Industries
World War II submarines of Japan
Japanese submarines lost during World War II
Ro-100-class submarines
Maritime incidents in May 1944
World War II shipwrecks in the Pacific Ocean
Submarines sunk by United States warships